Holasovice is a municipality and village in Opava District in the Moravian-Silesian Region of the Czech Republic. It has about 1,400 inhabitants.

Administrative parts
The villages of Kamenec, Loděnice and Štemplovec are administrative parts of Holasovice.

Geography
The Opava River flows through the municipality.

Transport
Holasovice lies on the railway line from Opava to Rýmařov.

Notable people
Pavel Křížkovský (1820–1885), choral composer and conductor

References

External links

Villages in Opava District